Diana Pancioli Kulisek, born in Detroit, Michigan, is professor of ceramics at Eastern Michigan University and the author of Extruded Ceramics published in 1999 by Sterling Publishing Co., Inc. She is a former head of Production at Pewabic Pottery in Detroit. Among her artistic works are the ceramic arches at the People Mover Cadillac Center Station  in Detroit.

Notes

References and further reading

Nawrocki, Dennis Alan and Thomas J. Holleman (1980). Art in Detroit Public Places. Wayne State University Press.

External links
View artwork online: http://www.dianapancioli.com

Artists from Detroit
Eastern Michigan University faculty
American ceramists
Year of birth missing (living people)
Living people
20th-century American women writers
20th-century American non-fiction writers
American women non-fiction writers
American women academics
21st-century American women